The following is a list of gangs, organized crime syndicates and criminal enterprises in the Netherlands.

Black/Afro-Dutch

Eastside Crips
Eight Tray Gangster Crips
Green Gang/Hoptillen Gang
Hopi Boys
Kloekhorststraat Gang
Luca Crips
Nigerian mafia
No Limit Soldiers
Rollin 200 Crips
Southside First Tray Crips
The Traynity
United Blood Nation
West-Holland Boys Crips

Hispanic and Latino

Lanzas Chilenos (Chilean)
MS-13 (Salvadorans)

Asian triads

14K (Chinese)
Ah Kong (mainly Singaporean Chinese)
Shui Fong (Chinese)
Sun Yee On (Han Chinese)
Wo Shing Wo (mainly Chinese and Vietnamese)

Turkish

Black Jackets
Turkish mafia

Southeastern European

Albanian mafia
Greek mafia
Romanian mafia

Italian organized crime

Camorra
Contini clan
Di Lauro clan
Licciardi clan
Secondigliano Alliance
'Ndrangheta

Eastern European

Bulgarian mafia
Serbian mafia
Solntsevskaya Bratva

Football hooligan firms

A.F.C.A.
S.C.F. Hooligans
F-side

Outlaw motorcycle clubs

Bandidos Motorcycle Club
Chicanos Motorcycle Club
Black Sheep Motorcycle Club
Confederates Motorcycle Club
Demons Motorcycle Club
Gladiators Motorcycle Club
Gringos Motorcycle Club
Hells Angels
Flying Eagles Motorcycle Club
Hardliners Motorcycle Club
Red Devils Motorcycle Club
Waardeloos Motorcycle Club
Mongols Motorcycle Club
No Surrender Motorcycle Club
Rebel Crew Motorcycle Club
Road Knights Motorcycle Club
Rogues Motorcycle Club
Satudarah
Saudarah
Supportcrew 999
Yellow Snakes
Spiders Motorcycle Club
Trailer Trash Travelers Motorcycle Club
Veterans Motorcycle Club

Defunct organized crime groups

Bruinsma crime syndicate
Chieftains Motorcycle Club
VAK410

References 

Lists of gangs
Crime in the Netherlands
Gangs in the Netherlands